Inanidrilus mexicanus is a species of annelid worm. It is known from the Gulf of Mexico on the west coast of Florida.

References

mexicanus
Biota of the Gulf of Mexico
Invertebrates of the United States
Animals described in 1982